Antoine Davis (born October 3, 1998) is an American college basketball player for the Detroit Mercy Titans of the Horizon League. He has twice been named the Horizon League Player of the Year.

Early life and high school career
Davis was born in Bloomington, Indiana, where his father, Mike Davis, was a member of the Indiana Hoosiers basketball coaching staff under Bob Knight. He started training for basketball at age 12 and worked with well-known coach John Lucas II in Houston, Texas. In part to continue his partnership with Lucas, he was homeschooled from seventh grade through high school and played basketball for Houston Homeschool Athletics (aka HHA Mavericks, fka SATCH Mavericks), a private homeschool support organization based in Houston. Davis played for Houston Hoops on the Amateur Athletic Union (AAU) circuit and averaged 23 points per game as a senior for HHA. After originally signing with Houston, Davis walked on to Detroit Mercy, where his father had been appointed head coach.

College career
Davis scored 32 points in his debut for Detroit Mercy against Western Michigan. He had 42 points against Loyola (MD) several weeks later, setting a Detroit freshman record. Davis scored 48 points in a win over Wright State, hitting 10-of-15 three-pointers. In the season finale, Davis scored 30 points versus Northern Kentucky, and the Titans finished 11–20. Davis finished the season with 132 three-pointers, surpassing the NCAA freshman record of 122 set by Stephen Curry. He became the first freshman to be named to the First Team All-Horizon League team since Gordon Hayward. Davis had 23 games in which he scored 20 or more points, and his 784 points was one behind Rashad Phillips' single-season school record 785 points in the 2000–01 season. Davis was the third-leading scorer in NCAA Division I with 26.1 points per game, to go with 3.1 rebounds and 3.6 assists per game. 

On February 29, 2020, Davis scored a season-high 43 points including two clinching free throws with 5.3 seconds remaining in a 90–88 victory over IUPUI. Davis was named to the First Team All-Horizon League at the conclusion of the regular season. He led the league in scoring with 24.3 points per game while also averaged 4.5 assists per game.

Davis passed the 2,000 career point mark on February 25, 2021 in a semifinal Horizon League tournament game against Robert Morris. Davis scored 46 points, three shy of the school's single-game scoring mark, while connecting on 10 three-pointers.

Davis was named the 2022 Horizon League co-Player of the Year alongside Jamal Cain of Oakland. Davis also became the first player in Horizon League history to be named to the First Team All-Conference in four straight seasons. After that season, he entered the NCAA transfer portal, signaling an intent to explore other options for his final season of athletic eligibility. However, he remained open to returning to UDM for his final season, listing it as one of his five finalists on April 24. On May 9, he announced that he was returning to UDM.

During his final season at UDM in 2022–23, he reached several statistical milestones. First, on December 1, 2022, he became the Horizon League's all-time leading scorer, passing Alfredrick Hughes of Loyola Chicago. Nine days later, Davis became the 11th Division I men's player with 3,000 career points. Davis' next milestone came on January 14, 2023, when he passed Wofford's Fletcher Magee for the most career three-pointers in D-I men's history. Davis has since moved into second place on the all-time D-I men's scoring list behind LSU great Pete Maravich, passing Portland State's Freeman Williams on January 21, 2023.

On February 27, 2023, Davis repeated as the Horizon League Player of the Year. In the process he became the first player in league history to be named to the all-league first team five times.

Career statistics

College

|-
| style="text-align:left;"| 2018–19
| style="text-align:left;"| Detroit Mercy
| 30 || 29 || 37.4 || .400 || .380 || .857 || 3.1 || 3.6 || .9 || .0 || 26.1
|-
| style="text-align:left;"| 2019–20
| style="text-align:left;"| Detroit Mercy
| 30 || 30 || 36.7 || .380 || .324 || .901 || 3.1 || 4.5 || 1.7 || .1 || 24.3
|-
| style="text-align:left;"| 2020–21
| style="text-align:left;"| Detroit Mercy
| 22 || 22 || 38.5 || .424 || .372 || .917 || 2.9 || 4.8 || 1.5 || .0 || 24.0
|-
| style="text-align:left;"| 2021–22
| style="text-align:left;"| Detroit Mercy
| 29 || 29 || 37.0 || .429 || .379 || .882 || 3.6 || 4.4 || 1.0 || .0 || 23.9
|- class="sortbottom"
| style="text-align:center;" colspan="2"| Career
| 111 || 110 || 37.3 || .406 || .364 || .887 || 3.2 || 4.3 || 1.3 || .0 || 24.6

Personal life
Davis' father, Mike Davis, is currently the head basketball coach at Detroit Mercy. Mike has coached various NCAA Division I teams, including Indiana, where he was an assistant to legendary coach Bob Knight before succeeding him. Davis' older brother, Mike Davis Jr., is an assistant coach for Detroit Mercy.

See also
 List of NCAA Division I men's basketball career 3-point scoring leaders
 List of NCAA Division I men's basketball career scoring leaders
 List of NCAA Division I men's basketball season scoring leaders

Footnotes

References

External links
Detroit Mercy Titans bio

1998 births
Living people
All-American college men's basketball players
American men's basketball players
Basketball players from Houston
Detroit Mercy Titans men's basketball players
Point guards
Sportspeople from Bloomington, Indiana